Billy Laing (born 25 April 1951) is a retired Scottish professional football centre forward who played in the Scottish League for Cowdenbeath, Berwick Rangers, Dunfermline Athletic and Brechin City. He was capped by Scotland at schoolboy level.

Honours 

Cowdenbeath Hall of Fame

References 

Scottish footballers
Cowdenbeath F.C. players
Scottish Football League players
Association football forwards
Dunfermline Athletic F.C. players
1951 births
Place of birth missing (living people)
Rangers F.C. players
Lossiemouth F.C. players
Berwick Rangers F.C. players
Association football outside forwards
Brechin City F.C. players
Living people